Cashel Byron's Profession is George Bernard Shaw's fourth novel. The novel was written in 1882 and after rejection by several publishers it was published in serialized form in a socialist magazine. The novel was later published as a book in England and the United States.  Shaw wrote five novels early in his career and then abandoned them to pursue politics, drama criticism and eventually play writing. The Admirable Bashville (1901), a short play based loosely on this novel, was written to protect American copyrights after the novel became unexpectedly successful in the United States.

Synopsis

Preface
In Shaw's preface "Novels of my Nonage", written in 1901, he disparages his early work, including Cashel Byron's Profession:   "...people will admire [the author] for the feats any fool can achieve, and bear malice against him for boring them with better work." He also resurrects a heavily edited Robert Louis Stevenson quote used to promote the book. The full text of the quote breaks down the story into parts, including one part “blooming gaseous folly”.

Novel
The novel follows Cashel Byron, a world champion prizefighter, as he tries to woo wealthy aristocrat Lydia Carew without revealing his illegal profession.

Lydia is portrayed as a moral and intelligent woman (although "priggish" according to Shaw) and is constantly contrasted with the "ruffian" Cashel. Lydia was advised by her recently deceased father to find a husband with a profession, as opposed to an idle gentleman or an art critic like her father. 

Cashel’s childhood ends when he runs away from school to Australia and becomes apprentice to an ex-world champion boxer. When Cashel goes to England to secure his world title in that country he meets Lydia at her country manor. After much miscommunication and drawing room comedy, Cashel gives up boxing and succeeds in marrying Lydia. As in his postscript to "Pygmalion" (1912), in which he describes Eliza Doolittle's future life, Shaw chose to portray the Byron marriage in a realistic manner and narrates how Lydia comes to regard Cashel as "one of the children".

Postscript
According to "Note on Modern Prizefighting" (1901) Shaw intended the fights described in Cashel Byron's Profession to turn the public away from the sport but the novel is written in such a light-hearted tone this unlikely result never materialized.

Adaptations 
The British musical Bashville, first performed in 1983, was adapted from the play The Admirable Bashville.

References

External links
 The Shaw Society
 Shaw's Corner
 Free full text on Internet Archive
The Anti-Romance Novels of GBS
 

1882 British novels
Novels by George Bernard Shaw
Novels first published in serial form
Works originally published in British magazines
Works originally published in political magazines
Novels about boxing